Rugby Club 't Gooi is a Dutch Rugby Union club based in the town of Naarden. They presently play in the Ereklasse.

2008/2009 and 2012/2013 and 2017/2018:  Rugby Club 't Gooi were the Dutch Champions.

Players currently in Netherlands squad
 Hugo Langelaan
 Daniel Workel
 Huey van Vliet
 Jim Boelrijk
 Arno Macken
 Norbecio Mambo

External links
 Official site
 History club site

Rugby clubs established in 1933
Dutch rugby union teams
Sports clubs in Gooise Meren